The Des Moines Building is an historic building located in downtown Des Moines, Iowa, United States built in 1930 and based on the designs of the Des Moines architectural firm of Proudfoot, Rawson, Souers & Thomas. It is a combination of the Art deco and Art Moderne styles. The former office building was abandoned and in May 2011 the city of Des Moines declared it a public nuisance so as to acquire it to be redeveloped. In November of the same year they sold the building for $150,000 to Des Moines Apartments, LP who developed it into 146 loft apartments. It was listed on the National Register of Historic Places in 2013. The basement is home to a recreational room as well as a workout room. The rooftop is accessible via the 14th floor and has a great 360 degree view of Des Moines. The building is also connected to the city's extensive skywalk system.

See also
National Register of Historic Places listings in Des Moines, Iowa

References

External links
 Official Website
 Facebook Page

Office buildings completed in 1930
National Register of Historic Places in Des Moines, Iowa
Office buildings on the National Register of Historic Places in Iowa
Apartment buildings in Des Moines, Iowa
Art Deco architecture in Iowa